The 2016 United States elections were held on Tuesday, November 8, 2016. Republican nominee Donald Trump defeated Democratic former Secretary of State Hillary Clinton in the presidential election, while Republicans retained control of Congress. This marked the first and most recent time Republicans won or held unified control of the presidency and Congress since 2004 though they regained the House in the 2022 elections.

Trump won his party's nomination after defeating Ted Cruz and several other candidates in the 2016 Republican presidential primaries. With Democratic president Barack Obama term-limited, Clinton secured the nomination over Bernie Sanders in the 2016 Democratic presidential primaries. Trump won the general election with 304 of the 538 electoral votes, although Clinton won the popular vote by a margin of 2.1%.

Democrats won a net gain of two seats in the Senate and six seats in the House of Representatives, but Republicans retained control of both chambers. In the gubernatorial elections, Republicans won a net gain of two seats. Various other state, territorial, and local races and referendums were held throughout the year. This was the first presidential election since 2000, where the winning candidate failed to have coattails in either house of Congress. This is the most recent election where one party simultaneously gained seats in both houses of Congress.

Wall Street banks and other big financial institutions spent a record $2 billion trying to influence the 2016 United States elections.

Issues
Trump's right-wing populist nationalist campaign, which promised to "Make America Great Again" and opposed political correctness, illegal immigration, and many United States free-trade agreements garnered extensive free media coverage due to Trump's inflammatory comments. Clinton emphasized her extensive political experience, denounced Trump and many of his supporters as a "basket of deplorables", bigots and extremists, and advocated the expansion of President Obama's policies; racial, LGBT, and women's rights; and inclusive capitalism.

Russian interference

The United States government's intelligence agencies concluded the Russian government interfered in the 2016 United States elections. A joint US intelligence review stated with high confidence that, "Russian President Vladimir Putin ordered an influence campaign in 2016 aimed at the US presidential election.  In May 2019, Republican Florida Governor Ron DeSantis announced Russians hacked voting databases in two Florida counties prior to the 2016 presidential election and no election results were compromised.

Electoral Candidate Campaigns and Exit Poll Results 
The election saw an aggressive set of campaigns from both Trump and Clinton leading up to the election, Clinton's being of particular interest when considering the exit polls and voter demographics. With her gender presenting as the biggest target for Trump's campaign as a point of criticism, the Clinton campaign made a conscious decision to capitalise on the negativity surrounding her gender to appeal to female voters (young women in particular) by co-opting feminist ideals alongside traditional democratic ones. The party's social media campaign was particularly aggressive, with the use of hashtags and celebrity endorsement being crucial to Clinton's appeal to the wider public.  This backfired however, when exit polls showed that, while Clinton was popular with the female vote, it was Trump who had won the favour of a majority white female demographic, with some citing political 'wokeness' as a voter turn-off.

Federal elections

Presidential election

The United States presidential election of 2016 was the 58th quadrennial presidential election. The electoral vote distribution was determined by the 2010 census from which presidential electors electing the president and vice president were chosen; a simple majority (270) of the 538 electoral votes were required to win. In one of the greatest election upsets in U.S. History, businessman and reality television personality Donald Trump of New York won the Republican Party's presidential nomination on July 19, 2016, after defeating Texas Senator Ted Cruz, Ohio Governor John Kasich, Florida Senator Marco Rubio, and several other candidates in the Republican primary elections.[1] Former Secretary of State, First Lady and New York Senator Hillary Clinton won the Democratic Party's presidential nomination on July 26, 2016, after a tough battle with Vermont Senator Bernie Sanders in the Democratic primary elections. This was the first election with a female presidential nominee from a major political party, as well as the first election since 1944 that had major party presidential nominees from the same home state. Clinton won the popular vote, taking 48% of the vote compared to Trump's 46% of the vote, but Trump won the electoral vote and thus the presidency. Libertarian Gary Johnson won 3.3% of the popular vote, the strongest performance by a third party presidential nominee since the 1996 election. Trump won the states of Michigan, Pennsylvania, Wisconsin (first time a Republican won all three since the 1984 United States presidential election), Florida, Ohio, and Iowa, all of which were won by Obama in 2008 and 2012. The election is one of five presidential elections in American history in which the winner of the popular vote did not win the presidency.

Congressional elections

Senate elections

All seats in Senate Class 3 were up for election. Democrats won a net gain of two seats, but Republicans retained a majority with 52 seats in the 100-member chamber.

House of Representatives elections

All 435 voting seats in the United States House of Representatives were up for election. Additionally, elections were held to select the delegates for the District of Columbia and the U.S. territories, including the Resident Commissioner of Puerto Rico.

Democrats won a net gain of six seats, but Republicans held a 241-to-194 majority following the elections. Nationwide, Republicans won the popular vote for the House of Representatives by a margin of 1.1 percent.

State elections

Gubernatorial elections

Regular elections were held for the governorships of 11 U.S. states and two U.S. territories. Additionally, a special election was held in Oregon after the resignation of John Kitzhaber as governor. Republicans won a net gain of two seats by winning open seats in Missouri, Vermont, and New Hampshire while Democrats defeated an incumbent in North Carolina. However, Governor Jim Justice of West Virginia switched his party affiliation to Republican shortly after his inauguration, thereby netting Republicans 3 seats and giving them 34 seats nationwide, tying their record set in the 1921 elections.

Legislative elections

In 2016, 44 states held state legislative elections; 86 of the 99 chambers were up for election. Only six states did not hold state legislative elections: Louisiana, Mississippi, New Jersey, Virginia, Alabama, and Maryland. 

Democrats won both chambers in the Nevada Legislature and the New Mexico House of Representatives, while Republicans won the Kentucky House of Representatives, the Iowa Senate, and the Minnesota Senate. The Alaska House of Representatives flipped from Republican control to a Democrat-led coalition majority, and the Connecticut State Senate went from Democratic control to tied control. Meanwhile, the New York Senate went from Republican to a Republican-led coalition.

Other elections and ballot measures

Many states also held elections for other elected offices, such as attorney general. Many states held ballot measures.

Local elections

Mayoral elections
Mayoral elections were held in many cities, including:
 Bakersfield, California: Incumbent Harvey Hall did not seek re-election. Karen Goh was elected to succeed Hall. The office is not partisan.
 Baltimore, Maryland: Incumbent Democrat Stephanie Rawlings-Blake did not seek re-election. Democrat Catherine E. Pugh was elected as Rawlings-Blake's replacement.
 Gilbert, Arizona: Incumbent John Lewis resigned prior to the election. Interim mayor Jenn Daniels was elected to succeed Lewis. The office is not partisan.
 Honolulu, Hawaii: Incumbent Democrat Kirk Caldwell won re-election to a second term.
 Milwaukee, Wisconsin: Incumbent Tom Barrett was re-elected to a fourth term. The office is not partisan.
 Portland, Oregon: Incumbent Charlie Hales did not seek re-election. Ted Wheeler was elected to succeed Hales. The office is not partisan.
 Richmond, Virginia: Incumbent Dwight C. Jones was term-limited and cannot seek re-election. Levar Stoney was elected as the new Richmond, VA, mayor. The office is not partisan.
 Sacramento, California: Incumbent Democrat Kevin Johnson did not seek re-election. Democrat Darrell Steinberg was elected as Johnson's replacement.
 San Diego, California: Incumbent Kevin Faulconer won a second term as mayor. The office is not partisan.
 Tulsa, Oklahoma: Incumbent Republican Dewey F. Bartlett Jr. was defeated by city councilor and fellow Republican G. T. Bynum.

Table of state, territorial, and federal results

This table shows the partisan results of Congressional, gubernatorial, presidential, and state legislative races held in each state and territory in 2016. Note that not all states and territories hold gubernatorial, state legislative, and United States Senate elections in 2016; additionally, the territories do not have electoral votes in American presidential elections, and neither Washington, D.C. nor the territories elect members of the United States Senate. Washington, D.C., and the five inhabited territories each elect one non-voting member of the United States House of Representatives. Nebraska's unicameral legislature and the governorship and legislature of American Samoa are officially non-partisan. In the table, offices/legislatures that are not up for election in 2016 are already filled in for the "after 2016 elections" section, although vacancies or party switching could potentially lead to a flip in partisan control.

Footnotes

References

External links

 

 
2016
November 2016 events in the United States